Auhawa Bangar is a village in Nohjhil Block, Mant Tehsil in Mathura District of Uttar Pradesh, India. It belongs to Agra Division. It is located 32 km north of district headquarters Mathura, and 13 km from Nohjhil.

Geography
According to Census 2011, the location code or village code of Auhawa Bangar village is 123928.

The village has a lower literacy rate compared to Uttar Pradesh. In 2011, the literacy rate of Auhawa Bangar village was 63.80% compared to 67.68% of Uttar Pradesh.

Mat is the nearest town to Auhawa Bangar village.

Politics
Mant (Assembly constituency) is the Vidhan Sabha constituency. Mathura (Lok Sabha constituency) is the parliamentary constituency.

Nearby cities and villages 
Cities

 Aligarh
 Khair
 Mathura
 Noida
 Vrindavan
 Hodal
 Hathras 

Villages

 Surir
 Bhidauni
 Kewat Nagla
 Shihavan Bangar

Adjacent communities

References
  

 
Villages in Mathura district